Antonio Martos may refer to:
 Antonio Martos Ortiz (born 1981), member of the boyband D'NASH
 Antonio Martos (cyclist) (born 1946), Spanish racing cyclist